Kurd Idol is the first International franchise in Kurdish television history. Kurd Idol reality singing competition that is part of the Idols franchise created by Simon Fuller and owned by 19 Entertainment and FremantleMedia. Kurdsat acquired the production and broadcast rights for Kurd Idol. The series aims to find new solo recording artists from across the Kurdish diaspora and the winner would be decided by viewers' votes through the Internet, telephone and text messages. To project is aimed to select the Kurdish singers from the historical Kurdistan region and diaspora.

Audition 
Auditions for Kurd Idol have been held in Kurdish cities of Van, Erbil, Mardin, Sanandaj, Slemani, and outside the region - in Berlin, Istanbul, Stockholm, Düsseldorf, Tbilisi and Yerevan.

Season 1

Jury
 Kanî
 Adnan Karim
 Nizamettin Ariç
 Bijan Kamkar, left show because of health problems.

Contestants
17 contestants have been chosen among more than 2,000 candidates who auditioned and 172 candidates who were chosen by judges to attend the subsequent theatre round in Slemani, Kurdistan Region.

Voting
According to the fact, that Kurdistan does not exist as a nation state, that is why the voting was able in three parts of the region — Eastern Kurdistan and whole Iran, Northern Kurdistan and whole Turkey, Southern Kurdistan and whole Iraq. The voting numbers were launched in few European countries where the Kurdish diaspora lives, particularly voting was able from Germany, Sweden, France and Denmark. Due to the war in Syria, voting was not able in Rojava Kurdistan.

Results

Prize 
 Kurd Idol album and recording contract

References

External links 
Official Website
Watch all the Episodes

Idols (franchise)
Non-British television series based on British television series